Sabanilla is a district of the Montes de Oca canton, in the San José province of Costa Rica.

Toponymy 

 comes from the root word , which translates as savanna and the diminutive suffix -illa, therefore the meaning becomes little savanna, a small area without a thick tree canopy.

History 

On August 2, 1915, the Montes de Oca canton is founded by law decree 45, under the Alfredo González Flores administration.
On April 24, 1977, Franz Hinkelammert established in Sabanilla the Departamento Ecuménico de Investigaciones (DEI), which is visited annually by many liberation theologians and communitary culture workers from all the Latin American region.

Geography 
Sabanilla has an area of  km² and an elevation of  metres.

Locations 
There are many residential projects completed:
 Barrio Arboledas
 Barrio Cedros
 Barrio Damiana
 Barrio El Rodeo
 Barrio Emmanuel
 Barrio Españolita
 Barrio Frutos Umaña
 Barrio La Familia
 Barrio Luciana
 Barrio Málaga
 Barrio Maravilla
 Barrio Marsella
 Barrio Paso Real
 Barrio Prado
 Barrio Rosales
 Barrio Sabanilla (downtown of the district)
 Barrio San Marino
 Barrio Toscana
 Barrio Tulin

Demographics 

For the 2011 census, Sabanilla had a population of  inhabitants.

Transportation

Road transportation 
The district is covered by the following road routes:
 National Route 202
 National Route 203

References 

Districts of San José Province
Populated places in San José Province